In topology, a field of mathematics, the join of two topological spaces  and , often denoted by  or , is a topological space formed by taking the disjoint union of the two spaces, and attaching line segments joining every point in  to every point in .

Definitions 
The join is defined in slightly different ways in different contexts

Geometric sets 

Some authors restrict the definition to subsets that are joinable: any two different line-segments, connecting a point of A to a point of B, meet in at most a common endpoint (that is, they do not intersect in their interior). Every two subsets can be made "joinable".

Topological spaces 

where the cylinder  is attached to the original spaces  and  along the natural projections of the faces of the cylinder:

where the equivalence relation  is generated by

Abstract simplicial complexes 

Otherwise, one can define, for example,  (adding 1 and 2 ensures that the elements in the union are disjoint).

Examples:

Then , which represents a line-segment.
Then , which represents a triangle.

Maps 

Special cases 

Examples 

 The join of two simplices is a simplex: the join of an n-dimensional and an m-dimensional simplex is an (m+n+1)-dimensional simplex. Some special cases are:
 The join of two disjoint points is an interval (m=n=0).
 The join of a point and an interval is a triangle (m=0, n=1).
 The join of two line segments is homeomorphic to a solid tetrahedron, illustrated in the figure above right (m=n=1).
 The join of a point and an (n-1)-dimensional simplex is an n-dimensional simplex.
 The join of two pairs of isolated points is a square (without interior). The join of a square with a third pair of isolated points is an octahedron (again, without interior). In general, the join of  pairs of isolated points is an -dimensional octahedral sphere.

Properties

Commutativity 
The join of two spaces is commutative up to homeomorphism, i.e. .

Associativity 
It is not true that the join operation defined above is associative up to homeomorphism for arbitrary topological spaces. However, for locally compact Hausdorff spaces  we have 

It is possible to define a different join operation  which uses the same underlying set as  but a different topology, and this operation is associative for all topological spaces.

Homotopy equivalence 

Reduced join 

is homeomorphic to the reduced suspensionof the smash product. Consequently, since  is contractible, there is a homotopy equivalence

This equivalence establishes the isomorphism .

Homotopical connectivity 
Given two triangulable spaces , the homotopical connectivity of their join is at least the sum of connectivities of its parts:

 .

As an example, let  be a set of two disconnected points. There is a 1-dimensional hole between the points, so . The join  is a square, which is homeomorphic to a circle that has a 2-dimensional hole, so .

See also

Desuspension

References

Hatcher, Allen, Algebraic topology. Cambridge University Press, Cambridge, 2002. xii+544 pp.  and 

 Brown, Ronald, Topology and Groupoids Section 5.7 Joins.

Algebraic topology
Operations on structures